Västerbottens Folkblad is a Swedish language newspaper published in Umeå, Sweden.

History and profile
Västerbottens Folkblad was founded in 1917. It is published in Umeå, Västerbotten and covers regional news from Västerbotten.

In 2001 the company which owns Västerbottens-Kuriren, another newspaper in Umeå, acquired 50% of the paper. Two years later the company became the majority owner of the paper with 91% of its share.

In 2010 the circulation of Västerbottens Folkblad was 12,300 copies.

References and notes

External links
Västerbottens Folkblad

1917 establishments in Sweden
Publications established in 1917
Daily newspapers published in Sweden
Swedish-language newspapers
Mass media in Umeå